The Saint Joseph the Worker Cathedral commonly known as the Saint Joseph Cathedral is a Roman Catholic church in San Jose, Occidental Mindoro, Philippines.

History
Ecclesiastically, Mindoro island was under the jurisdiction of the Diocese of Manila until the creation of the Diocese of Lipa in 1910 when Mindoro was transferred under Lipa. The then Mindoro province was made into an apostolic prefecture in 1936 with Bishop William Finneman, SVD as head of the prefecture. Mindoro was still under Lipa. In 1951, following the split of Mindoro province into Occidental Mindoro and Oriental Mindoro, the prefecture was elevated to the Apostolic Vicariate of Calapan.

The current church building was constructed under the administration of Parish Priest George Koschinski, SVD. Prior to the church building constructed under Koschinski, the chapel of San Jose used a quonset hut which was used by the Allied Forces during the World War II. The replacement church structure was built by both German and Filipino Catholics and was blessed by Apostolic Vicariate of Mindoro, Bishop William Duschak, SVD, DD on September 30, 1962.

John Paul II created the Apostolic Vicariate of San Jose de Mindoro which composes the whole province of Occidental Mindoro on January 27, 1983. Vicente C. Manuel, SVD was appointed as first Apostolic Vicar. Manuel was ordained as a bishop on June 29, 1983. Within the same year the church was converted into a cathedral. Antonio P. Palang, SVD was appointed as second Apostolic Vicar on May 31, 2002.Pablito Tagura, SVD was appointed as third Apostolic Vicar on December 17, 2022.

Patrons
Saint Joseph is the primary and titular patron of the St. Joseph Cathedral whose feast day is on May 1. Our Lady of Fatima is the secondary patroness of the church whose feast day is on May 13.

References

Joseph Cathedral, San Jose, Occidental Mindoro
Tourist attractions in Occidental Mindoro
Joseph Cathedral, San Jose, Occidental Mindoro
20th-century Roman Catholic church buildings in the Philippines